State Route 342 (SR 342) is a state highway in Hamblen County in the eastern part of the U.S. state of Tennessee. The western portion of the route (from US 11E west) serves as a connector to Panther Creek State Park.

Route description

SR 342 begins inside Panther Creek State Park at the intersection of Panther Creek Park Road and Panther Creek Road. The route then heads southeast to junction with US 11E and the two routes begin a short  concurrency to and intersection with SR 160 where SR 342 turns south along SR 160. The two routes begin a short  concurrency. Then SR 342 turns southeast and meets its eastern terminus, an intersection with SR 66.

Major intersections

See also

References

342
Transportation in Hamblen County, Tennessee
Morristown, Tennessee